A leadership spill of the Australian Labor Party (ALP), then the opposition party in the Parliament of Australia, was held on 16 February 1959.

Background
Senior Labor left-winger Eddie Ward unsuccessfully challenged ALP leader H. V. Evatt following Evatt's third defeat at the polls in the 1958 election. Evatt was re-elected by a lower than expected margin of only 14 votes. The closeness of the ballot further highlighted the dissatisfaction with Evatt's leadership.

At the same caucus, Arthur Calwell was re-elected as deputy leader unopposed.

Results
The following table gives the ballot results:

See also
1958 Australian federal election

References

Australian Labor Party leadership spills
Australian Labor Party leadership spill